Francisco "Tatica" Campos Toledo (January 27, 1892 - ?) was a Cuban baseball pitcher in the Negro leagues. He played from 1911 to 1922 with several teams.

References

External links

1892 births
Almendares (baseball) players
Habana players
Cuban Stars (East) players
Cuban Stars (West) players
San Francisco Park players
Year of death missing
People from Artemisa Province